Handforth Town Council is the parish council for the civil parish of Handforth in Cheshire, England. Previously known as Handforth Parish Council, it was renamed Handforth Town Council on 31 July 2021.

History

First iteration
Following the Local Government Act 1894 Handford Parish Council was established for the rural Handforth parish. It was part of the Stockport Rural District and in 1901 had a population of 794. In 1904 the rural district was abolished. The Handforth civil parish became an urban district and the parish council became Handforth Urban District Council, absorbing powers that were previously the responsibility of Stockport Rural District Council. In 1936 the council and urban district were abolished as part of a Local Government Act 1929 county review order and the former area was split between Cheadle and Gatley and Wilmslow.

Second iteration
The parish council was established again in May 2011 with the new civil parish formed from part of Wilmslow. Its duties and role are to represent the local community, consult and advise on planning applications and provide local amenities and activities such as Christmas lighting and grounds maintenance. Its early projects, such as the development of green belt land, the building of a war memorial, the creation of an after-school club, the creation of the parish council's Facebook page and installation of CCTV cameras were blocked by members of the council, mostly the Handforth Ratepayers. Accusations of personal conflicts of interest were made by the Ratepayers and their rivals on the council, Improving Handforth, and relations between the two became increasingly fractious. Formal complaints were made by both groups, including by Aled Brewerton (who was then a member of the public). Lawyers' statements were read out at meetings on a regular basis.

A meeting of the council was highlighted by politics student Shaan Ali in 2021, who noted, "it's the parish councils who directly work with communities and it's so fascinating because [they argue] over the smallest issues."  He found the video on YouTube and told a friend, Janine, who tweeted it. This was then retweeted by thousands of accounts, including those of Piers Morgan, Richard Osman and Greg James,  leading to increased attention and the meeting going viral, becoming the subject of attention and comment.

Parish councils are permitted to be known as town councils, village councils, community councils or neighbourhood councils and require only a resolution of the parish council to change their name. At a meeting of Handforth Parish Council on 13 July 2021 it was resolved that from 31 July 2021 it would be known as Handforth Town Council.

Councillors
Elections were held in 2019 when the following councillors were elected.  The chair is John Smith and the vice chair is Susan Moore. Since the 2019 elections, Jean Thompson has been disqualified and both Aled Brewerton and Barry Burkhill have resigned. In 2021, Julie Smith and Sam Milward were elected and Kerry-Jane Sullivan was voted in as a co-opted member.

East Ward
This ward was not contested.
 Cynthia Samson (chair of finance committee) – Improving Handforth
 John Smith (chair of council) – Improving Handforth

South Ward
 Ribia Nisa – Labour
Kerry Sullivan – Improving Handforth

West Ward
 Susan Moore (vice chair of council, chair of planning and environment committee) – Independent
 Julie Smith (chair of personnel committee) – Independent
Sam Milward – Independent

Elections

2019 elections

East Ward
Incumbent Councillors Cynthia Samson and John Smith were returned, uncontested. Both had been elected in 2015 under the "Improving Handforth" banner and were returned uncontested under the same banner.

South Ward
Incumbent Councillor Brian Tolver was re-elected, with a reduced majority. He had previously been elected in 2015 as an Independent, but stood in 2019 under the banner of "Handforth Ratepayers' Association". He was joined by long-serving Cheshire East Council member Barry Burkhill, who has represented Handforth on Cheshire East Council and its predecessor Macclesfield Borough Council since 1979. Burkhill joined Tolver in standing as a member of the "Handforth Ratepayers' Association". He replaced incumbent Councillor Ian Clark, who did not re-contest the seat.

There were 5 spoilt ballots in the South Ward.

West Ward
All three Councillors for the heavily-contested West Ward were elected for the first time. The three incumbent Councillors returned in 2015, Kerry Burgess ("Independent and Protect Greenbelt"), Matthew Clark (Independent) and Kerry Sullivan (an ally of Councillors Samson and Smith in the East Ward, under the "Improving Handforth" banner) all declined to re-contest their seats. The three successfully-returned Councillors in 2019, Aled Brewerton, Susan Moore and Jean Thompson, were all elected as Independents. However, after the election, both Aled Brewerton and Jean Thompson would side with the two "Handforth Ratepayers' Association" Councillors in South Ward, while Susan Moore would side with the two Independent Councillors in East Ward who had originally been elected under the "Improving Handforth" banner. Councillor Thompson was then unseated in 2020, due to a failure to attend any council meetings for six months.

There were 20 spoilt ballots in the West Ward.

2015 elections

East Ward

There were 44 spoilt ballots in the East Ward.

South Ward

There were 37 spoilt ballots in the South Ward.

West Ward

Complaints
In 2017, residents complained about the conduct of parish councillors as they believed meetings were becoming unproductive. The Independent described Handforth council meetings as "full of petty arguments about points of order and whether items had been agreed for the agenda – with the battle of ideas entirely absent."

A letter from David Brown, director of governance and compliance at Cheshire East Council, made references to councillors' behaviour in the past and alleged misconduct, including suggestions by unnamed councillors that elections should not be held:

At an employment committee meeting held on 4 November 2020, three councillors – Brian Tolver, Aled Brewerton and Barry Burkhill – tried to suspend the clerk Ashley Comiskey Dawson.

On Cheshire East Council (CEC), Burkhill faced a vote of no confidence from Conservative councillor Liz Wardlaw for his "complicity in the bullying" of Jackie Weaver – coordinator of a council Zoom call meeting – and for bringing "this council and his role within this council into disrepute". The motion was referred to the council’s standard committee and was not debated at the full council meeting in February. Burkhill quit the parish council in May 2021 saying, "I have decided to concentrate on my Handforth Ratepayer Independent role at CEC, as too much of my time has been taken up in trying to deal with HPC's enduring problems."

In April 2021, chair Brian Tolver and vice-chair Aled Brewerton both announced they would be stepping down from the parish council. Their resignations were believed to have been in response to the reaction of the now viral Zoom meeting. Brian Tolver only resigned as chair, not as councillor in the April meeting, whereas Brewerton resigned from both.

Zoom meeting 
In a Zoom meeting of the Handforth Parish Council Planning and Environment Committee on 10 December 2020, two camps formed over a bureaucratic dispute. Jackie Weaver, chief officer of the Cheshire Association of Local Councils (ChALC), was brought into the meeting to moderate and provide guidance on the running of the council.

She is recorded as clerk to the meeting in the official minutes, but is not the official clerk of Handforth Parish Council. For this reason, council chairman Brian Tolver refused to accept the legality or legitimacy of the meeting, called by two other councillors, as no proper officer was present, saying that she had "no authority here", sentiments echoed by vice chair Aled Brewerton. (Weaver said there was no need for a proper officer to be involved while she was acting as clerk.) This led to Tolver being moved from the meeting into a virtual waiting room. In response to Weaver initiating a vote for a proxy chair in Tolver's absence, Brewerton angrily insisted that he should assume control as vice chair. Brewerton (whose father Keith was present on his Zoom and behaving disruptively in the meeting) was consequently removed from the conference by Weaver, along with councillor Barry Burkhill, who had protested the expulsion of Tolver and Brewerton. Councillor John Smith was nominated as proxy chair, and allowed a vote to confirm the removals.

In March 2022, a series of six reports commissioned by Cheshire East Council into the conduct of councillors of the then Handforth Parish Council was published. One concluded that during the 10 December 2020 meeting, Weaver did not "have the authority" to mute councillors and move them into the virtual waiting room, but that "Faced with what were unusual and difficult circumstances, and the deep-seated issues underpinning those circumstances, we can understand why Jackie Weaver acted as she did, despite her action being without any formal footing in terms of appropriate process and procedure". The six reports cost a total of £85,000.

Viral clips and legacy 
The Zoom meeting went viral, because most parish council meetings have a reputation for being sedate and well-mannered. The event spawned memes, merchandise, and international media coverage. It was described as "like an absurdist British play" by The Washington Post, who noted that Weaver "was hailed for her fortitude and stoicism — two revered British traits". After gaining online traction on the evening of 4 February 2021, Weaver's name was the highest trending topic on Twitter in the United Kingdom that night and the following day. On 5 February, Weaver appeared on Woman's Hour on BBC Radio 4, followed by an appearance on The Last Leg. Among the various tributes that have been paid to Weaver is a song titled "An Ode to Jackie Weaver", with music composed by Andrew Lloyd Webber and lyrics penned by Don Black. In the song, Weaver is affectionately hailed as "Britain’s answer to the American dream" and "the role model we all strive to be. She doesn't want a medal, just a nice cup of tea". On 10 February, Lloyd Webber appeared on Good Morning Britain to explain his composition; Carrie Hope Fletcher sang the new lyrics, with Lloyd Webber accompanying her at the piano.

Weaver said of the incident that she has had "nothing but positive support" for her behaviour and actions in the Zoom call, adding: "There is an element of bullying and bad behaviour in local councils, and a lot of us are working very hard, and that includes central government, to try to do something about that. Because we're passionate about the fact that local government is the mechanism by which people can really engage with their communities." Weaver has also said that the aggressive and bullying attitudes of the councillors had "gone on in Handforth for some period of time", adding that she believed sexism played a part of the reason as to why Tolver and others acted in such an aggressive and confrontational manner, saying "maybe an underlying part of it was they just didn't like being told no by a woman".

During the now-viral meeting, councillor John Smith described the events as "a very good example of bullying within Cheshire East and the environs".

Tolver maintained that he was in the right, calling Weaver "an unqualified member of the public" and adding: "Removing half the councillors from the meeting denied half of the voters of the village from being represented – it was an appalling attack on their democratic rights." He has also called the clips being shared on YouTube and social media – which were found by a 17-year-old local government enthusiast and politics A-Level student from East London – "corrupt copies" and "hooky videos".

Following the viral video, councillors received an unprecedented number of complaints from parishioners arguing the council was not fit for purpose. In February 2021 Burkhill faced a vote of no confidence from Conservative councillor Liz Wardlaw: The motion was referred to the council’s standard committee but was not debated at the full council meeting. Burkhill served out his term of office as mayor, staying in post until May 2021 and then continued as a councillor, but he quit the parish council the same month saying, "I have decided to concentrate on my Handforth Ratepayer Independent role at CEC, as too much of my time has been taken up in trying to deal with HPC's enduring problems." Burkhill passed away on November 19, 2022 at age 83 from melanoma. 

Robert Jenrick, the communities and local government secretary, had been considering legislation which would make parish council Zoom meetings permanent as a result of the "Jackie Weaver phenomenon" which has increased interest in the meetings.

The February meeting on Zoom had over 1,000 people watching the live stream and large numbers watched the March and April live stream. In the April live stream, the chair of Handforth Parish Council, Brian Tolver, resigned (as chair, but not from his position as councillor) during the meeting.

In August 2021, Weaver was the celebrity invited to open the annual Ambridge village fete in BBC Radio 4's long-running soap opera The Archers. The following February she was a contestant on BBC's Celebrity Mastermind, with a specialist subject of The Chronicles of Riddick, and a chosen charity of Cheshire Community Action. She scored 15 points and finished in second place. Her appearance was met with some media comment.

References

External links
 Channel 4 News – Meet Shaan Ali, the 17-year-old A-Level student who made a small parish council meeting go viral after he unearthed it on YouTube.
 Twitter – the original tweet by Shaan Ali's friend Janine

Town Councils in Cheshire
Local precepting authorities in England
Internet memes introduced in 2021